The Ster Zeeuwsche Eilanden  also known as Rabo Ster Zeeuwsche Eilanden due to former sponsorships reasons is a 3 days elite women's road bicycle stage race held in the province of Zeeland, Netherlands. The race was established in 1998 and was named in the first years Ster van Walcheren. The race is rated by the UCI as a 2.2 category race. The 2013 and 2014 editions were cancelled due to financial reasons.

Past winners 

Source:

References

External links
 Official website
 

 
Recurring sporting events established in 1998
Cycle races in the Netherlands
1998 establishments in the Netherlands
Women's road bicycle races
Cycling in Zeeland